Lancaster was a constituency of the House of Commons of the Parliament of England then of the Parliament of Great Britain from 1707 to 1800 and of the Parliament of the United Kingdom from 1801 to 1867, centred on the historic city of Lancaster in north-west England. It was represented by two Members of Parliament until the constituency was disenfranchised  for corruption in 1867.

Under the Redistribution of Seats Act 1885, Lancaster was re-established for the 1885 general election as a county constituency. It then returned one Member of Parliament (MP)  to the House of Commons of the Parliament of the United Kingdom, with elections held under the first-past-the-post system. This constituency in turn was abolished when it was largely replaced by the new Lancaster and Wyre constituency for the 1997 general election.

History

Lancaster returned Members to Parliament between 1295 and 1331 but is not known to have done so again, on the grounds of the poverty of the town's burgesses, until the election of William Banester in 1523.

Representation was reduced during the protectorate: Lancaster was not represented in the Barebones Parliament and sent only one Member to the first and second Protectorate Parliaments.

The two Member constituency was disenfranchised in 1867 for corruption and representation not restored until 1885 as a one Member constituency. The constituency was finally abolished in 1997 and replaced by the constituency of Lancaster and Wyre.

Boundaries

1885–1918: The Borough of Lancaster, the Sessional Divisions of Garstang and Hornby, and part of the Sessional Division of South Lonsdale.

1918–1950: The Boroughs of Lancaster and Morecambe, the Urban Districts of Heysham and Preesall, the Rural District of Garstang, and part of the Rural District of Lancaster.

1950–1983: The Borough of Lancaster, the Urban District of Carnforth, the Rural District of Lunesdale, and in the Rural District of Lancaster the parishes of Ashton with Stodday, Cockerham, Elllel, Heaton with Oxcliffe, Middleton, Overton, Over Wyresdale, Scotforth, and Thurnham.

1983–1997: The City of Lancaster wards of Bulk, Castle, Caton, Ellel, Hornby, John O'Gaunt, Scotforth East, Scotforth West, Skerton Central, Skerton East, and Skerton West, and the Borough of Wyre wards of Brock, Calder, Catterall, Duchy, Garstang, Great Eccleston, Pilling, and Wyresdale.

Members of Parliament

Lancaster borough

1295–1640

1640–1867

Lancaster county constituency

1885–1997

Elections

Elections in the 1830s

 
 

Fenton-Cawthorne's death caused a by-election.

Elections in the 1840s

 
 

 
 
 

Gregson's election was declared void on petition due to bribery, causing a by-election.

Elections in the 1850s

 

Armstrong's election was declared void due to corruption and bribery, causing a by-election.

Elections in the 1860s
Garnett resigned, causing a by-election.

Gregson's death caused a by-election.

 

Extensive bribery caused both members to be unseated on 23 April 1866, and the seat to lose its right to return a member of Parliament under the Reform Act 1867. It was incorporated into North Lancashire.

Elections in the 1880s

Elections in the 1890s

Elections in the 1900s

Elections in the 1910s 

General Election 1914–15:

Another General Election was required to take place before the end of 1915. The political parties had been making preparations for an election to take place and by the July 1914, the following candidates had been selected; 
Liberal: Norval Helme
Unionist:

Elections in the 1920s

Elections in the 1930s 

George H Bryans was adopted as Liberal candidate but in October 1931 had a heart attack and withdrew.

Elections in the 1940s
General Election 1939–40:

Another General Election was required to take place before the end of 1940. The political parties had been making preparations for an election to take place from 1939 and by the end of this year, the following candidates had been selected; 
Conservative: Herwald Ramsbotham
Liberal: William Ross
Labour: Albert Farrer

Elections in the 1950s

Elections in the 1960s

Elections in the 1970s

Elections in the 1980s

Elections in the 1990s

Notes and references

Craig, F. W. S. (1983). British parliamentary election results 1918–1949 (3 ed.). Chichester: Parliamentary Research Services. .

Sources
Robert Beatson, A Chronological Register of Both Houses of Parliament (London: Longman, Hurst, Res & Orme, 1807) 
D Brunton & D H Pennington, Members of the Long Parliament (London: George Allen & Unwin, 1954)
Cobbett's Parliamentary history of England, from the Norman Conquest in 1066 to the year 1803 (London: Thomas Hansard, 1808) 
 The Constitutional Year Book for 1913 (London: National Union of Conservative and Unionist Associations, 1913)
F W S Craig, British Parliamentary Election Results 1832–1885 (2nd edition, Aldershot: Parliamentary Research Services, 1989)
 Maija Jansson (ed.), Proceedings in Parliament, 1614 (House of Commons) (Philadelphia: American Philosophical Society, 1988) 
 J E Neale, The Elizabethan House of Commons (London: Jonathan Cape, 1949)
 J Holladay Philbin, Parliamentary Representation 1832 – England and Wales (New Haven: Yale University Press, 1965)
 Henry Stooks Smith, The Parliaments of England from 1715 to 1847 (2nd edition, edited by FWS Craig – Chichester: Parliamentary Reference Publications, 1973)

Parliamentary constituencies in North West England (historic)
Constituencies of the Parliament of the United Kingdom established in 1295
1376 disestablishments
Constituencies of the Parliament of the United Kingdom established in 1523
Constituencies of the Parliament of the United Kingdom disestablished in 1868
Constituencies of the Parliament of the United Kingdom established in 1885
Constituencies of the Parliament of the United Kingdom disestablished in 1997
Parliamentary constituencies disenfranchised for corruption
Politics of Lancaster
History of Lancaster